José Vital Branco Malhoa, known simply as José Malhoa (28 April 1855 – 26 October 1933) was a Portuguese painter.

Malhoa was, with Columbano Bordalo Pinheiro, the leading name in Portuguese naturalist painting in the second half of the 19th century. He often painted popular scenes and subjects, like his two most famous paintings: The Drunks (1907) and Fado (1910). He always remained faithful to the naturalist style, but in some of his works there are impressionist influences, as in his Autumn (1918), that can be considered an "impressionist exercise".

Malhoa was born in Caldas da Rainha, and died in Figueiró dos Vinhos, aged 78. At the end of his life, he saw the inauguration of the José Malhoa Museum, in Caldas da Rainha.

Malhoa's House, also known as the Dr. Anastácio-Gonçalves House-Museum, in Lisbon, was originally built in 1905 as a residence and studio for the artist. It was bought by Dr. Anastácio-Gonçalves, an art collector, a year before the painter's death, and it became a museum in 1980, showcasing several items from his collection, namely works from Portuguese painters of the 19th and 20th century.

References

Literature
Henriques, P.: José Malhoa; INAPA, Lisbon, 1996.

External links
Biography and Works, in Portuguese.
José Malhoa - artworks at Google Arts & Culture

1855 births
1933 deaths
People from Caldas da Rainha
19th-century Portuguese painters
Portuguese male painters
19th-century male artists
20th-century Portuguese painters
20th-century male artists